At least two ships of the Italian Navy have been named in honour of Alpino Attilo Bagnolini and may refer to either
Alpino Bagnolini or  Attilio Bagnolini 

 , a  launched in 1939 and renamed UIT-22 when seized by Germany in 1943. She was sunk in 1944.
 , a  launched in 1967 and decommissioned in 1991.

Italian Navy ship names